The 2018 NCAA Division I Men's Swimming and Diving Championships were contested from March 21–24, 2018 at the Jean K. Freeman Aquatic Center at University of Minnesota in Minneapolis, Minnesota at the 95th annual NCAA-sanctioned swim meet to determine the team and individual national champions of Division I men's collegiate swimming and diving in the United States.

Team standings
Note: Top 10 only
(H) = Hosts
(DC) = Defending champions
Italics = Debut finish in the Top 10
Full results

Swimming results 
Full results

Diving Results

See also
List of college swimming and diving teams

References

NCAA Division I Men's Swimming and Diving Championships
NCAA Division I Men's Swimming And Diving Championships
NCAA Division I Men's Swimming And Diving Championships
NCAA Division I Men's Swimming and Diving Championships